Concordius of Spoleto is a little-known Christian saint and martyr of the 2nd century. There is another martyr Concordius  who died in the 4th century.

Life 
Concordius was ordained a subdeacon by Pope Pius I in Rome, and was reclusive; spending most of his time alone and praying. He was imprisoned during the Christian persecutions of Marcus Aurelius and tried in Spoleto, Italy.

Trial 

The trial was overseen and judged by the governor of Umbria, Italy. Concordius was allowed his freedom if he would denounce his faith and worship a statue of the Roman god Jupiter. When Concordius refused, the judge had him beaten on a rack. After the torture however, Concordius praised Jesus, after which he was thrown in jail. Two days later, he was offered a second chance and presented with a statue to worship. Concordius then spat on the idol and was promptly beheaded, c.175 AD. Concordius was canonized by religious officials at that time, but it is unsure when or where this occurred.

Veneration 
His feast day is January 2 (Roman Catholic) and June 4 (Eastern Orthodox).

References

External links
 See for more information

175 deaths
2nd-century Christian martyrs
Year of birth unknown